BlueJeans by Verizon is a company that provides an interoperable cloud-based video conferencing service. It is headquartered in the Santana Row district of San Jose, California. Prior to being acquired by Verizon, the company was known as "BlueJeans Network."

History
Krish Ramakrishnan and Alagu Periyannan founded BlueJeans Network in 2009, the development of which ended in six months of trials for the technology. Prior to founding the company, Ramakrishnan worked at Accel Partners, and Periyannan was the CTO of Blue Coat Systems as well as a tech lead at Apple Inc. Stu Aaron, the company's chief commercial officer (CCO), described the early work as, "Ultimately, what we're trying to do is make video conferencing as comfortable and as casual as your pair of jeans." The company was able to acquire $23.5 million in venture capital from Accel Partners, NEA, and Norwest Venture Partners, and launched its commercial service on June 29, 2011 with Ramakrishnan as CEO.

The company sought to open up video conferencing to companies across the board, including small businesses and freelancers, in addition to the traditional market of larger corporations. In its first 75 days, BlueJeans grew to 4,000 subscribers from 500 firms. Upon launching, Deutsche Telekom became the company's first major channel partner. The agreement between the firms was to develop "a scalable, interoperable videoconferencing solution in Europe by the end of the year". In 2011 and 2012 it added other channel partners, including InterCall, York Telecom, and AVI/SPL. BlueJeans has been used by more than 300,000 people worldwide. In 2013 BlueJeans Network expanded its user base to the UK and Australia. In November 2013, Ari Levy of Businessweek wrote that, "BlueJeans has raised about $100 million in venture funding and estimates it will stream one billion minutes' worth of meetings during 2014, a tenfold increase from this year."

Verizon communications announced on April 16, 2020, that it had entered into an agreement to acquire BlueJeans to expand its Business portfolio offerings, particularly its unified communications offerings. While the price of the acquisition was not announced, it is believed to be in the sub $500M range. The acquisition was completed on May 15, 2020, with the service rebranded as "BlueJeans by Verizon."

Video conferencing
BlueJeans provides a proprietary cloud-based video meetings service, interoperable with software development kit etc., that connects users across different devices, platforms and conference programs. Every BlueJeans member has a private “meeting room” in the BlueJeans cloud to schedule and host conference meetings. It operates with business conferencing solutions such as Cisco, Microsoft Lync, StarLeaf, Lifesize, and Polycom as well as consumer services like Google. InformationWeek has written that, "BlueJeans is best known for bridging room-based videoconference services with consumer options like Google Talk, and doing it on an impromptu basis". This service can be used directly through BlueJeans Network or through its partner companies. For example, in 2012 BlueJeans Network began powering the videoconferencing services of InterCall.

CRN described BlueJeans services as "endpoint agnostic", meaning it does not discriminate and can work with any video call software or technology, including smartphones. This allows it to bridge between non-room-based videoconference services as well, regardless of the device or service used. In 2012 Telecompaper wrote that the "Interoperable video conferencing services specialist BlueJeans Network has rolled out a multipoint control unit (MCU) that gives customers the opportunity to experience multi-way videoconferencing in the cloud. This offering allows customers to license a variable number of concurrent connections (known as 'virtual ports') from BlueJeans".

Michal Lev-Ram of Fortune wrote that, "the company is mostly an enhancement—not a threat—to existing videoconference equipment makers. And whichever company ends up leading the charge, there's no question that interoperability is an inevitable must in videoconferencing, just like it was in text messaging on mobile phones. The more use corporate customers can get out of their videoconferencing systems, the more they'll invest in buying them." In contrast to this, Ari Levy reported in 2013 that BlueJeans Network and similar services had begun to cut into the revenues of larger, room-based hardware system developers, due to their greater flexibility and accessing the market of smaller businesses. That year BlueJeans Network also partnered with Salesforce.com, providing BlueJeans run video conferencing to all Salesforce clients through its "Chatter" tool. Forbes also wrote that BlueJeans "will also enable the sharing of presentations, documents, and video clips in real-time" for Salesforce customers. Other customers for BlueJeans Network include Facebook, Foursquare, and MIT.

Awards and recognition
In February 2012, Frost & Sullivan awarded its Entrepreneurial Company of the Year Award to BlueJeans. The Wall Street Journal named BlueJeans a runner up in the Software category of its 2012 Innovation Awards. In September 2012, the Telecom Council awarded BlueJeans the Graham Bell Award for Best Communication Solutions in its annual SPIFFY awards. In November 2012, University Business honored BlueJeans with its 1st Annual Readers' Choice Awards in the category of Video Conferencing Services. CRN named BlueJeans one of the 25 Coolest Emerging Vendors for 2012. Gartner also named BlueJeans to its Cool Vendors Report for 2012.

In 2013 CRN repositioned BlueJeans on its list to number six among its ten top start-ups. In 2013 CIO magazine ranked BlueJeans No. 3 among the top ten cloud startups of that year, and Business Insider ranked it among its top 21 cloud startups.

References

External links
 
 BlueJeans Blog

Videotelephony
Web conferencing
Companies based in San Jose, California
2009 establishments in California
Verizon Communications acquisitions
2020 mergers and acquisitions
American companies established in 2009
Telecommunications companies established in 2009